Anuragi is a 1988 Indian Malayalam-language romance film scripted and directed by I. V. Sasi with story and dialogues by A. Sheriff. It stars Mohanlal, Suresh Gopi, Ramya Krishnan and Urvashi. The film features musical score by Gangai Amaran.

Plot
Annie meets with an accident in a forest. She falls in love with Shamu, who rescues her. Annie returns to Shamu's camp but could not find him. However, Shamu could not resist calling her when he is near her house. Things get a twist when it is shown that Shamu is a married man with a child. This makes Annie to meet him again and learns that his wife Leelamma Varghese is in a mental hospital with a poor prognosis, possibly due to PTSD due to rape she underwent during a tour. Annie and Shamu go for a trip, but they consummate, and Shamu gives word that he will marry her. On his return to his house, he knows that Leelamma who fell from a far height, has her mental illness cured. This puts him in a dilemma. Leelamma tells him to marry Annie too. Soon, Shamu learns that Roy, who was about to marry Annie, was the one who raped Leelamma. In the climax fight between Shamu and Roy, both Roy and Leelamma die by falling into a waterfall.

Cast 
Mohanlal as Shamu
Suresh Gopi as Roy
Ramya Krishnan as Annie
Urvashi as Leelamma Varghese
Janardhanan as Varghese
Saritha as Rose Amma
C. I. Paul as Ummachan
Kuthiravattam Pappu as Kunjhaappan
Rohini as Julie
Prathapachandran

Soundtrack 
The music was composed by Gangai Amaran and the lyrics were written by Yusufali Kechery.

References

External links 
 
 

1988 films
1980s Malayalam-language films
Films directed by I. V. Sasi